Christopher Allen (born 1953) is an Australian art historian, critic, and educator.

Biography
Born in Algiers to Australian parents, Allen was educated in the United Kingdom, Vietnam, Japan, France and Australia. He graduated in 1975 from the University of New South Wales with a Bachelor of Arts in French (First Class Honours, University Medal) and won a scholarship to study for his  (Master of Arts) at the University of Aix-en-Provence and the Collège de France. Allen was the inaugural manager at the Performance Space in Redfern in 1983. In 1992 he completed his PhD at the University of Sydney.

He was art critic for The Sydney Morning Herald from 1987 until 1991 and for the Australian Financial Review from 2005 until 2008. Since 2008 he is the national art critic for The Australian.

Allen has taught art history and theory at the National Art School from 1997 until 2008. He is Senior Master in Academic Extension at Sydney Grammar School since 2009 and teaches Classical Greek, Latin and senior Art History. He was appointed to the Library Council of New South Wales (State Library) Board in 2019 for three-year term.

In his critiques of works and artists, Allen emphasises craftmanship, skill, and formal and aesthetic qualities. He deplores "bland, decorative surface[s]" and he points to "pseudo-political contemporary art", especially as expressed in the wall labels in museums. Large-scale portraits, as commonly submitted to the Archibald Prize, are regular subjects of his criticism.

Personal life
Allen is the grandson of World War II Major General Arthur Samuel "Tubby" Allen, the son of Robert Allen and brother of writer, performer and filmmaker Richard James Allen. He is married to Australian painter Michelle Hiscock.

Publications

As author
La tradition du classicisme : essai sur la pratique et la théorie de la peinture classique de la Renaissance au dix-septième siècle français, thesis University of Sydney (1991)
Art in Australia: From Colonization to Postmodernism (Thames & Hudson, 1997) 
French Painting in the Golden Age (Thames & Hudson, 2003) 
Charles-Alphonse Dufresnoy, De Arte Graphica (translation and commentary, Librairie Droz, Geneva 2005, with Yasmin Haskell, Frances Muecke), on Charles Alphonse du Fresnoy's De arte graphica
"Jeffrey Smart: Unpublished Paintings 1940–2007", essay (Philip Bacon Galleries, 2008) , on Jeffrey Smart
Salient: Contemporary Artists at the Western Front: 1918–2018 One Hundred Years On (King Street Gallery on William, 2018)

As editor/contributor
Richard Goodwin, editor (Oliver Freeman Editions, 1992) , on Richard J. Goodwin
Ari Purhonen, editor (1992) 
Van Gogh: His Sources, Genius and Influence (1993) 

 A Companion to Australian Art, editor (Wiley-Blackwell, 2021),

References

External links
Articles by Christopher Allen in The Australian
Articles by Christopher Allen, Australian Book Review
, arts.afterhours, 8 June 2010, Art Gallery of New South Wales

1953 births
Living people
University of New South Wales alumni
Aix-Marseille University alumni
Collège de France alumni
University of Sydney alumni
Australian art critics
Australian art historians
Australian art teachers
Australian schoolteachers
Classics educators
The Australian journalists